David W. Mays III (born June 20, 1949) is a former American football quarterback. He played college football at Texas Southern. He played professionally in the World Football League (WFL) in 1974, then in the National Football League (NFL) for three seasons, for the Cleveland Browns and Buffalo Bills.

Football career
Mays began his pro football career in 1974 with the World Football League's Houston Texans and Shreveport Steamer before coming to the NFL. He is remembered for filling in for Brian Sipe of the Cleveland Browns, who was knocked out of a game on October 10, 1976, against the Pittsburgh Steelers.  Mays started the season as the third-string quarterback and had never played in the NFL regular season before.  He led the Browns to an 18–16 victory.

Personal life
Mays was a Doctor of Dental Surgery, even during his playing days with the Browns.  He practiced dentistry for 20 years in Greater Cleveland. He was accused of the 1990 attempted murder of the dentist to whom he had sold his practice, but was acquitted in a 1992 trial. In 1994, he was found guilty of welfare fraud for operating a phony billing scheme.

See also
 Racial issues faced by black quarterbacks

References

1949 births
Living people
American football quarterbacks
Texas Southern Tigers football players
Cleveland Browns players
Buffalo Bills players
American dentists
American people convicted of fraud
African-American players of American football
21st-century African-American people
20th-century African-American sportspeople